Karim El Deeb (born 10 June 1995), is an Egyptian footballer who plays for Egyptian Premier League side Al Ittihad as a left-back.

References

1995 births
Living people
People from Monufia Governorate
Egyptian footballers
Association football fullbacks
Tanta SC players
Al Mokawloon Al Arab SC players
El Raja SC players
Al Ittihad Alexandria Club players
Egyptian Premier League players